Health communication is the study and practice of communicating promotional health information, such as in public health campaigns, health education, and between doctor and patient. The purpose of disseminating health information is to influence personal health choices by improving health literacy. Health communication is a unique niche in healthcare that allows professionals to use communication strategies to inform and influence decisions and actions of the public to improve health.

Because effective health communication must be tailored for the audience and the situation, research into health communication seeks to refine communication strategies to inform people about ways to enhance health or to avoid specific health risks. Academically, health communication is a discipline within communication studies.

Health communication may variously seek to:
 increase audience knowledge and awareness of a health issue
 influence behaviors and attitudes toward a health issue
 demonstrate healthy practices
 demonstrate the benefits of behavior changes to public health outcomes
 advocate a position on a health issue or policy
 increase demand or support for health services
 argue against misconceptions about health
 improve patient-provider dialogue
 enhance effectiveness in health care teams

Definition and Origins
Health communication  is an area of research that focuses on the scope and implications of meaningful expressions and messages in situations or circumstances associated with health and health care. Health communication is considered an interdisciplinary field of research, encompassing medical science, public health, and communication studies.

The term health communications was used in 1961 when the National Health Council organized a National Health Forum to discuss challenges faced in the communications of health information (Helen, 1962). The term was used again in 1962 when Surgeon General Luther Terry organized a conference on health communication to discuss how various techniques can make health information available to the public (US Department of Health Education and Welfare, 1963). The term was adopted by members of an interest group at ICA, International Communication Association in 1975. 
The research of health communication surrounds the development of effective messages about health, the dissemination of health-related information through broadcast, print, and electronic media, and the role of inter personal relationships in health communities. At the core of all of the communication is the idea of health and the emphasis of health. The goal of health communication research is to identify and provide better and more effective communication strategies that will improve the overall health of society. (Atkin & Silk, page 489)

Research
There are many purposes and reasons why health communication research is important and how it betters the health care field. The training programs of Health Care Professionals, or HCP, can be adapted and developed based on health communication research. (Atkin & Silk, 495) Due to there being a diverse culture that makes up the group of patients within the health care field, communication to other cultures has been taught and has been made a focus in health care training classes. Research suggests that nonverbal and verbal communication between health care professionals and patient can lead to improved patient outcomes. According to Atkin and Silk on page 496 some health care facilities, like hospitals are providing training and education materials to patients. The goal of hospitals doing this is to allow for patients to have a better outcome due to better communication skills.
Over the years, there has been much research done on health communication. For example, researchers want to know if people are more effectively motivated by a positive message versus a negative message. Researchers examine ideas like, are people better motivated by ideas of wealth and safety or an idea of illness and death. Researchers are examining which dimensions of persuasive incentives are most influential: physical health versus economic, versus psychological, versus moral, versus social. (Atkin & Silk, 497)
Impact of the Health Campaign-After research has been conducted and analyzed on the effects of health communication, it can be concluded that a health communication campaign that is requiring a behavior change causes the desired behavior change in about 7%-10%  or more in the people who are in the campaign site than those who are in the control group. Also, the effects are stronger for adoption of a new behavior than cessation of a current behavior, about 12% higher.

When assessing how affective a health campaign is, the key determinant is the degree of audience reception, the quality and quantity of the message, the dissemination channels, and the larger communication environment. It is possible that an audience can be more receptive to some messages than others. The media channel and how the message is reached by the audience can affect the effectiveness of the health campaign. (Atkin & Silk, page 498)

The efforts and effects of health messages and communication are often counter affected by alcohol and tobacco commercials. The advertisement for these items is often made to be glamorous and will contradict what was said in the health campaign. This can lead to the efforts of the health communication seem to be pointless.

Training
Health communication professionals are specifically trained in methods and strategies for effective communication of public health messages, with qualifications in research, strategic development, and evaluating effectiveness. Health communication is taught in master's and doctoral programs. The Coalition for Health Communication maintains a list of such programs.

Scholars and practitioners in health communication are often trained in disciplines such as communication studies, sociology, psychology, public health, or medicine and then focus within their field on either health or communication. Practitioners are pragmatic and draw from social-scientific scholarship, theories from the humanities, and professional fields such as education, management, law and marketing (Maibach 2008). Professionals trained in health communication encounter a wide range of employment opportunities spanning between the public, private, and volunteer sectors and have the opportunity for a large amount of career mobility. Examples of jobs in each of these categories include federal, state, and local health departments in the public sector, Pharmaceutical companies and large corporations in the private sector, and various non-profit organizations such as the American Cancer Society and the American Heart Association in the volunteer sector.

Overview
International Communication Association officially recognized health communication in 1975; in 1997, the American Public Health Association categorised health communication as a discipline of Public Health Education and Health Promotion.

Careers in the field of health communication range widely between the public, private, and volunteer sectors and professionals of health communication are distinctively trained to conduct communication research, develop successful and repeatable campaigns for health promotion and advocacy, and to evaluate how effective these strategies have been for future campaigns.

Clear communication is essential to successful public health practice at every level of the ecological model: intrapersonal, interpersonal, group, organizational, and societal. In each instance of health communication, there must be careful deliberation concerning the appropriate channel for messages to best reach the target audience, ranging from face-to-face interactions to television, Internet, and other forms of mass media. The recent explosion of new Internet communication technologies, particularly through the development of health websites (such as MedlinePlus, Healthfinder, and WebMD), online support groups (such as the Association for Cancer Online Resources), web portals, tailored information systems, telehealth programs, electronic health records, social networking, and mobile devices (cell phones, PDAs, etc.) means that the potential media are ever changing.

The social and cultural contexts in which health communication occurs are also widely diverse and can include (but are not limited to) homes, schools, doctor's offices, and workplaces, and messages must consider the variant levels of health literacy and education of their audience, as well as demographics, values, socioeconomic issues, and many other factors that may influence effective communication.

During the Covid-19 pandemic, it became clear that major topics in health communication include misinformation as well as the role of communication in addressing health inequities. Misinformation had a major impact on vaccine acceptance and people’s adoption of pandemic prevention measures. Not only does misinformation contribute to vaccine hesitancy, social discrimination and stigma, but is also affected by the ongoing global trust crisis in science and official sources. This further contributes to behavioural and social divides and to increasing long-standing inequities. A narrative shift is essential to address these issues.

Critical Health Communication 
Critical Health Communication refers to scholarship that interrogates "how meanings and enactments of health are tied to issues of power through the systematic construction and maintenance of inequalities." It examines links with culture, resources, and other social structures. It is distinct from mainstream Health Communication in its emphasis on qualitative and interpretive methods, and its attention to the ideological processes that underpin shared understandings of health. Unlike much mainstream Health Communication, most Critical Health Communication holds that simply circulating better quality, or more visible message about health is not enough to meaningfully influence health outcomes or correct health care disparities. The first comprehensive review of Critical Health Communication was published in 2008, and since then the volume of Health Communication research taking a critical approach has steadily increased.

Strategies and methods
Tailoring a health message is one strategy for persuasive health communication. For messages of health communication to reach selected audiences accurately and quickly, health communication professionals must assemble a collection of superior and audience appropriate information that target population segments. Understanding the audience for the information is critical to effective delivery.

Communication is an enigma that is detrimental to the healthcare world and to the resulting health of a patient. Communication is an activity that involves oral speech, voice, tone, nonverbal body language, listening and more. It is a process for a mutual understanding to come at hand during interpersonal connections. A patient's communication with their healthcare team and vice versa, affects the outcome of their health. Strong, clear, and positive relationships with physicians can chronically improve and increase the condition of a certain patient. Through two approaches, the biomedical model and the biopsychosocial model; this can be successfully achieved. Evidence has shown that communication and its traditions have altered throughout the years. With the use of many new discoveries and the changes within our technology market, communication has severely improved and become instantaneous.

Communicators need to continually synthesize knowledge from a range of other scholarly disciplines including marketing, psychology, and behavioural sciences. Once this information has been collected, professionals can choose from a variety of methods and strategies of communication that they believe would best convey their message. These methods include campaigns, entertainment advocacy, media advocacy, new technologies, and interpersonal communication.

Campaigns
Health Communication campaigns are arguably the most utilized and effective method for spreading public health messages, especially in endorsing disease prevention (e.g. cancer, HIV/AIDS) and in general health promotion and wellness (e.g. family planning, reproductive health). The Institute of Medicine argues that health communication campaigns tend to organize their message for a diverse audience in one of three ways:
 By catering to the common denominator within the audience
 By creating one central message and then later making systematic alterations in order to better reach a certain audience segment, while retaining the same central message
 By creating distinctly different messages for different audience segments
Both the Centers for Disease Control and Prevention and scholars of health communication emphasize the importance of strategic planning throughout a campaign.  This includes a variety of steps to ensure a well-developed message is being communicated:
 Reviewing background information to define what the problem is and who is affected by the problem
 Setting communication objectives and proposing a plan to meet the wanted outcome
 Analyze the target audience by determining interests, attitudes, behaviors, benefits, and barriers
 Select channels and materials for communication in relation to what will most effectively reach audiences
 Develop and pretest message concepts to determine understanding, acceptance, and reaction to the message
 Implement communication with selected audience and monitor exposures and reactions to the message
 Assess the outcome and evaluate the effectiveness and impact of the campaign, noting if changes need to be made

Historical campaigns

American smallpox epidemic
In 1721, health communication was used to mitigate the smallpox epidemic in Boston. Cotton Mather, a political leader, used pamphlets and speeches to promote inoculation of smallpox. Alcohol abuse has been a problem within society for about as long as alcohol has been around. In the 19th century, the Women's Christian Temperance Union led a movement against alcohol abuse. They utilized mass communication to communicate the desired message. News papers and magazines allowed for the promotion of the anti-alcohol movement.

Cardiovascular disease
Three-community study and the five-city project were experimental campaigns to inform middle-aged men about the causes of cardiovascular disease. Health messages were communicated via television, radio, newspaper, cookbooks, booklets, and bus cards. The three "communities" comprised three experimental communication strategies: a media-only campaign, a media campaign supplemented with face-to-face communication, and a no-intervention control group. The experimented revealed that after one year, the most informed at-risk men were those in the second experimental group: they men consumed the media campaign and were attended by a health care provider.

Communication channels

Entertainment media
Using the entertainment industry as a platform for advocating health information and education is a communication strategy that has become increasingly popular. The most utilized strategy is for health communication professionals to create partnerships with storyline creators so that public health information can be incorporated into within the plot of a television show. The Centers for Disease Control and Prevention has formed a strong partnership with Hollywood, Health, and Society, at the University of Southern California Norman Lear Center to continue to produce new storylines on television and in film studios that will help to promote public health information. Some of the resources provided with this partnership include comprehensive "tip sheets" to provide writers with easy to access and trustworthy information on health issues, and meetings and panels to discuss new information and resources. Some of the most notable examples of this method of communication in recent years have been with the films Contagion and I Am Legend in understanding the spread of disease, NBC's series Parenthood in Asperger's Syndrome, and with the CW's series 90210 and spreading cancer awareness. More recently, film festivals and competitions focused specifically on health films have been organised by the American Public Health Association, the International Health Film Festival, the Global Health Film Initiative of the Royal Society of Medicine and the Public Health Film Society.

Writers and storyline developers have an increased motivation to continue to incorporate public health information into their scripts with the creation of the Sentinel for Health Awards in 2000, which honors storylines that effectively promote health topics and audience awareness of public health issues. Surveys conducted by Porter Novelli in 2001 reported many interesting statistics on the effectiveness of this strategy, such as that over half of regular prime time and daytime drama viewers have reported that they have learned something about health promotion or disease prevention from a TV show. Amongst this data, minority groups are significantly represented with well over half of African American and Hispanic viewers stating that they had either taken some form of preventative action after hearing about a health issue on TV, or that a TV storyline helped them to provide vital health information to a friend or family member.

Direct marketing

Media advocacy use strategic mass media tools combined with widespread organization in order to advocate for healthy public policies or lifestyles. This can include the use of text messaging and email to spread messages from person to person, and using social networking venues to promote health information to a wide-ranging audience. As technologies expand, the platforms for health communication through media advocacy will undoubtedly expand as well.

Interpersonal communication
Health communication relies on strong interpersonal communication in order to influence health decisions and behaviours. The most important of these relationships are the connection and interaction between an individual and their health care provider (e.g., physician, therapist, pharmacist) and an individual's social support system (family, friends, community). These connections can positively influence the individual's decision to make healthy choices. Patients are more prone to listen when they feel invested emotionally into the situation. If they feel as if they understand what is being said, they are more prone to make objective decisions based on the information heard. Two of the most prominent areas of study in interpersonal health communication are the patient-centered and the relationship centered models of care.

Applications
Health communication has become essential in promoting the general public health in myriad situations. One of health communication's most important applications has been throughout major Environmental events (e.g. hurricanes, flooding, tornados) and addressing the affected audience's questions and needs quickly and efficiently, keeping the protection of public health and the forefront of their message. Health communication professionals are constantly working to improve this type of risk communication in order to be prepared in the case of an emergency.

Another increasingly important application of health communication has been in reaching students in the college community. The National College Health Assessment has measured that 92.5% of college students reported being in "good, very good, or excellent health", however college students seem to battle serious problems with stress, depression, substance abuse, and a general lack of nutrition in comparison to other age groups and audiences. Professionals in health communication are actively striving for new ways to reach this at-risk audience in order to raise standards of public health in the college setting and to promote a healthier life style amongst students.

Challenges
There are many challenges in communicating information about health to individuals. Some of the most essential issues have to do with the gap between individual health literacy and healthcare workers and institutions, as well as flaws in communicating health information through mass media.

Literacy-communication gap

One problem that health communication seeks to address is the gap that has formed between health literacy and the use of health communication.  While the goal is that health communication will effectively lead to health literacy, issues such as the use of unexplained medical jargon, ill-formed messages, and often a general educational gap have created barriers to patient healthcare literacy. Specifically, studies have been done amongst elderly populations in America to illustrate a common audience who is left at a disadvantage due to this issue. The older adults comprise an age group that generally has the most chronic health conditions in comparison to other age groups, however studies have shown that this group has difficulty understanding written health materials, understanding health care and policies, and generally do not comprehend medical jargon. Such shortcomings of health communication may lead to increased hospitalizations, the inability to respond to and manage a disease or medical condition, and a generally declining health status.

To redress these problems, health communication professionals have recommended programs for improving physician communication with patients. One recommendation is to improve medical student training by adding lectures, workshops, and supervised encounters with patients to teach interpersonal and communication skills as a core competency. It is also recommended that practicing physicians improve their communication skills by attending webinars and on-site customized training programs. If physicians can improve their communication skills, they can ameliorate the problem of patient healthcare illiteracy and contribute to better patient adherence to medical advice.

In some populations, health-related websites (e.g., WebMD) and online support groups (e.g., Association for Cancer Online Resources) have increased access to health information. The role of language in communication, especially related to the patients' preferred language physicians use to communicate with them in, also plays a role.  Results of a 2019 systematic review found that limited English proficient (LEP) patients have improved health outcomes when they receive care from physicians fluent in the patients' own preferred language. The National Institute for Health and Care Research (NIHR) has published review of research for providers of health information, on what happens when health information is not clear, how to help people understand health information, and which groups of the population may need extra support understanding health content. It covers research on using simple, balanced language, finding the correct focus, alternative formats (e.g. videos, visuals), and online information.

Mass media
Mass communication is used to promote beneficial changes in behavior among members of populations.  A major criticism of the use of mass media as a method of health communication is the unfortunate ability for false and misinformed messages to spread quickly through the mass media, before they have the chance to be disputed by professionals. This issue may generate unwarranted panic amongst those who receive the messages and be an issue as technology continues to advance. An example of this may be observed in the ongoing distrust of vaccinations due to the publication of numerous messages that wrongly link the childhood measles-mumps-rubella (MMR) vaccination with the development and onset of Autism. The speed with which this message spread due to new social networking technologies caused many parents to distrust vaccinations and therefore forgo having their children receive the vaccine. Although this panic is based on false information, many still harbor a lingering suspicion towards vaccinations and refuse them, which has caused a public health concern.

Historical timeline
The following are some key events in the development of health communication as a formal discipline since the 1970s.

See also

References

Notes

Sources
 U.S. Department of Health and Human Services, Office of Disease Prevention and Health Promotion. Healthy People 2010. Volumes 1 and 2, Chapt. 11, p 11–20. https://web.archive.org/web/20100122053253/http://www.healthypeople.gov/document/HTML/Volume1/11HealthCom.htm.
 Cline R., American Public Health Association (APHA) Health Communication Working Group Brochure, 2003. https://web.archive.org/web/20190119083227/http://www.healthcommunication.net/APHA/APHA.html.  Retrieved in January 2010.
 Schiavo, R. Health Communication: From Theory to Practice. San Francisco: Jossey-Bass, 2007.
 
 
 
 
 Ringo Ma. (Ed.) (2009). Jiankang chuanbo yu gonggong weisheng [Health communication and public health]. Hong Kong: Hong Kong Educational. (in Chinese and English)
 Ringo Ma. (Ed.) (2009). Yi bing goutong zhi duoshao [How much do you know about doctor-patient communication?]. Hong Kong: KAI Education. (in Chinese and English)

External links

 American Public Health Association Health Communication Working Group
 The Annenberg Public Policy Center, Health Communication
 Applied Research on Communication in Health Group, University of Otago, Wellington
 Center for Communication and Health, Northwestern University 
 Center for Excellence in Health Communication to Underserved Populations, The University of Kansas William Allen White School of Journalism and Mass Communications 
 Center for Health Communication, Moody College of Communication, The University of Texas at Austin
 Center for Health Communication, Harvard T.H. Chan School of Public Health
 Center for Health Communication Intervention
 Center for Health Communications Research, University of Michigan
 Center for Health Literacy, MAXIMUS
 The Center for Health & Risk Communication, George Mason University
 Center for Health and Risk Communication, University of Maryland
 Center for Public Health Readiness and Communication, Drexel University School of Public Health
 Coalition for Healthcare Communication
 Ebola Communication Network
 FHI 360 Center for Global Health Communication and Marketing
 Centre for Health Communication and Participation, La Trobe University
 Gateway to Health Communication & Social Marketing Practice, Centers for Disease Control and Prevention
 Health Communication Partnership
 Health Communication Research Centre, Cardiff School of English, Communication & Philosophy 
 Health and Science Communications Association
 Health Communication Research Center, The Missouri School of Journalism
 Health information: are you getting your message across?
 International Communication Association, Health Communication Section
 Institute for Healthcare Communication
 International Communication Association
Johns Hopkins University Center for Communication Programs
 Lerner Center for Public Health Promotion, Columbia University Mailman School of Public Health
 Office of Disease Prevention and Health Promotion Health Communication Activities
 University of Georgia Center for Health and Risk Communications 
 Graduate Program in Health Communication, Tufts University School of Medicine
 Journal of Health Communication 
 Public Health Film Society

 
Communication studies